
Gmina Popielów is a rural gmina (administrative district) in Opole County, Opole Voivodeship, in south-western Poland.

The gmina contains part of the protected area called Stobrawa Landscape Park.

Villages
Gmina Popielów contains the villages and settlements of Kaniów, Karłowice, Kurznie, Kuźnica Katowska, Lubienia, Nowe Siołkowice, Popielów, Popielowska Kolonia, Rybna, Stare Kolnie, Stare Siołkowice and Stobrawa.

Neighbouring gminas
Gmina Popielów is bordered by the gminas of Dąbrowa, Dobrzeń Wielki, Lewin Brzeski, Lubsza, Pokój, Skarbimierz and Świerczów.

Twin towns – sister cities

Gmina Popielów is twinned with:

 Bad Wurzach, Germany
 Bikal, Hungary
 Krakovany, Czech Republic
 Krakovany, Slovakia
 Rüdersdorf, Germany

References

Popielow
Opole County